Crunchy Nut (previously known as "Crunchy Nut Corn Flakes" in the UK, and "Nut & Honey Crunch"/"Honey & Nut Corn Flakes" in the US) is a breakfast cereal made by Kellogg's with flakes of corn, honey, three types of sugar, and chopped peanuts. The product was created by Kellogg's employees at their Trafford Park factory in Greater Manchester and first introduced in 1980.

While always known as Crunchy Nut or Crunchy Nut Corn Flakes in the UK, the cereal has undergone several name changes in the US. It debuted as Honey & Nut Corn Flakes, followed by the minor variation Honey-Nut Corn Flakes. The name changed to Nut & Honey Crunch in 1987 with a memorable ad campaign centered around the "nuttin', honey" pun. In the late '90s, it became Honey Crunch Corn Flakes. Despite this history, a 2011 UK press release announced Crunchy Nut's introduction to the US.

Ingredients  
Maize, brown sugar (sugar, molasses), peanuts (7%), sugar, honey (2%), barley malt flavouring, salt, glucose-fructose syrup, niacin, iron, vitamin B6, riboflavin (B2), thiamin (B1), folic acid, vitamin B12.

Other products 

UK

Clusters
 Honey & Nut
 Milk Chocolate Curls
 Peanut Butter

Granola
Caramelised Hazelnuts
Fruit & Nut
Hazelnut & Chocolate

Bars
 Crunchy Nut Chocolate Peanut Crisp Bar
 Crunchy Nut Caramel Peanut Crisp Bar
 Chocolate & Nuts Granola Bar
 Cranberry & Nuts Granola Bar
 Almond Nut Butter Bar
 Cocoa Hazelnut Nut Butter Bar

Creations Granola
70% Cocoa Chocolate & Honey Roasted Almonds
Pecan Nuts, Honeycomb & Roasted Almonds

Granola Fusions
Chocolate & Hazelnut

Other Cereals
 Crunchy Nut Bites
 Crunchy Nut Nutty
 Crunchy Nut Clusters/Bites (Ireland Only)
 Crunchy Nut Clusters with Chocolate Swirls
 Crunchy Nut Chocolate

USA
 Crunchy Nut: Golden Honey and Nuts
 Crunchy Nut: Nuts and Honey Os
 Crunchy Nut: Caramel Nut

Australia
Crunchy Nut Clusters

References

External links
 

Kellogg's cereals
Products introduced in 1980
English cuisine